Hazardia squarrosa is a North American species of shrub in the family Asteraceae known by the common name sawtooth goldenbush. It is native to California in the United States and Baja California in Mexico.

Hazardia squarrosa grows in coastal and inland scrub and chaparral habitats. It is covered in thick, sharply toothed leaves a few centimeters long and is generally not very hairy or woolly. It bears numerous flower heads covered in greenish, pointed phyllaries and opening into an array of long yellow to slightly reddish disc florets but no ray florets.

Varieties
Hazardia squarrosa var. grindelioides (DC.) W.D.Clark - from Monterey County to Baja California
Hazardia squarrosa var. obtusa (Greene) Jeps. - Counties of Santa Barbara, Ventura, Los Angeles, Kern
Hazardia squarrosa var. squarrosa - from San Benito County to San Diego County

References

External links
Jepson Manual Treatment
Calphotos Photo gallery, University of California

Flora of California
Flora of Baja California
squarrosa
Plants described in 1833
Flora without expected TNC conservation status